"I'm Letting Go" is the lead single from American Christian music artist Francesca Battistelli's major label debut album, My Paper Heart. The song was released on July 15, 2008.

Release
In addition to being featured on Battistelli's major label debut, My Paper Heart, it is featured on her It's Your Life EP, and her My Paper Heart (Dented Fender Sessions). It has also been featured on the compilation, WOW Hits 2009.

Critical reception
Matthew Watson of Jesus Freak Hideout stated that the rhythmic pattern of "I'm Letting Go" sounds almost exactly like Sara Bareilles' hit, "Love Song".

Accolades
The song was the 16th most played song Christian radio in 2008. It was also nominated for the Pop/Contemporary Recorded Song of the Year at the 40th GMA Dove Awards.

Personnel 
 Francesca Battistelli – vocals 
 Tim Lauer – keyboards 
 Aaron Shannon – additional programming 
 Mike Payne – guitars 
 Tony Lucido – bass 
 Ben Phillips – drums

Charts

Weekly charts

Year-end charts

References

2008 singles
Contemporary Christian songs
2008 songs
Song recordings produced by Ian Eskelin
Songs written by Ian Eskelin
Francesca Battistelli songs
Songs written by Francesca Battistelli